The deep palmar branch of ulnar artery (deep volar branch, profunda branch) passes between the Abductor digiti minimi and Flexor digiti minimi brevis and through the origin of the Opponens digiti minimi; it anastomoses with the radial artery, and completes the deep volar arch.

See also
 Deep branch of ulnar nerve

References 

Arteries of the upper limb